The 1979 Team Ice Racing World Championship was the inaugural edition of the Team World Championship. The final was held on 4 May 1979 in Kalinin (Tver) in the Soviet Union.

Classification

See also 
 1979 Individual Ice Speedway World Championship
 1979 Speedway World Team Cup in classic speedway
 1979 Individual Speedway World Championship in classic speedway

References 

Ice speedway competitions
World